Expedition 4 was the fourth expedition to the International Space Station (7 December 2001 - 15 June 2002).

Crew

Mission parameters
Perigee: 384 km
Apogee: 396 km
Inclination: 51.6°
Period: 92 min

Mission objectives
The International Space Station expanded its science investigations, almost doubling the previous amount of experiments performed during the Expedition Four mission. The fourth resident crew launched on 5 December 2001 on board Space Shuttle Endeavour during mission STS-108. They became official station residents at 20:03 UTC on 7 December 2001, and remained on board until June 2002, when they landed on STS-111.

An international crew of three were the fourth crew to live aboard the International Space Station. The team was led by Russian Yuri I. Onufrienko and joined by American crewmates Daniel W. Bursch and Carl E. Walz, both flight engineers. As a part of the STS-108 mission, Endeavour delivered the Expedition 4 crew to the station. They returned to Earth 19 June 2002, aboard Space Shuttle Endeavour following the STS-111 mission.

Spacewalks
The Expedition Four crew conducted three spacewalks during its stay on board the International Space Station. The crew spent a total of 17 hours and 51 minutes outside the station. These spacewalks brought the total up to 34—nine station-based and 25 shuttle-based—that have been conducted at the station for total of 208 hours and 5 minutes.

References

External links

 Expedition 4 Photography

Expedition 04
2001 in spaceflight
2002 in spaceflight